Fannin is an unincorporated community in eastern Goliad County, Texas, United States.  Its elevation is 141 feet (43 m). It is part of the Victoria, Texas Metropolitan Statistical Area.

History
Fannin is named for James Fannin, who commanded the group of Texans killed in the Goliad Massacre during the Texas Revolution.

Recreation
Fannin is home to the Coleto Creek Reservoir. It is a venue for camping, fishing and other outdoor recreation.

References

Unincorporated communities in Goliad County, Texas
Unincorporated communities in Texas
Victoria, Texas metropolitan area